The FSB Criminalistics Institute, also the Institute of Criminalistics of the Centre for Special Technology of the Federal Security Service of the Russian Federation, — a division of the Federal Security Service (FSB) of the Russian Federation. Divisions of the institute provide a variety of services: polygraph testing, recognition of people or their individual characteristics using biometric data, linguistic expertise, analysis of chemicals (including detection of trace amounts of drugs and poisons), robotic mine clearance and others.

History 
The Central Research Institute of the KGB of the USSR (now the Criminalistics Institute as part of the Centre for special technology of the FSB of the Russian Federation) was established in 1977 to perform the functions of a high-tech investigative unit.

The polygraph laboratory, established in 1975 at the KGB of the USSR, was incorporated into the Institute in 1994 as its department. Since the spring of 1996, the Institute has been running courses for polygraph examiners led by the head of this department.

During the 1991 Soviet coup attempt, one of the premises of the Operations Centre of the Criminalistics Institute was used by the putschists as a command centre.

The Criminalistics Institute took part in the investigation of high-profile terrorist acts and accidents: the Russian apartment bombings in 1999, the sinking of the Russian submarine Kursk (K-141) in 2000, the Moscow theatre hostage crisis in 2002, the Beslan school siege in 2004 and others.

Activities 
The Criminalistics Institute has been and remains a secret institution since its inception.

In Soviet times, the "Criminalistics laboratory of military unit 34435" made secret forensic suitcases. One of the activities of the organization in Soviet times was the production of poisons and means of their covert use. One of the Institute's divisions is still working with poisons.

In modern Russia, the FSB Criminalistics Institute conducts forensic, linguistic and other examinations, among other things, its specialists studied the Shroud of Turin, claiming its authenticity.

Russian journalist  claimed that polonium was stored in the Institute, which was later used to poison former FSB officer Alexander Litvinenko.

In December 2020, a joint investigation by Bellingcat and The Insider, with the participation of Der Spiegel, CNN and the Anti-Corruption Foundation, concluded that the Institute's employees are working with chemical weapon, in particular, with a Novichok agent. The same investigative group reported that a team of FSB operatives worked under the cover of the Institute, which organized the assassination attempt on Russian opposition leader Alexei Navalny in Tomsk, and that this team operated under the leadership of Stanislav Makshakov, deputy head of the FSB Criminalistics Institute.

In January 2021, another investigation by Bellingcat and The Insider, with the participation of Der Spiegel, was published, in which it was alleged that a team of FSB officers involved in the poisoning of Alexei Navalny was also involved in the murder of journalist Timur Kuashev in 2014, public figure Ruslan Magomedragimov in 2015 year and the leader of the New Russia movement Nikita Isaev in 2019.

Personalities 

 Kirill Yurievich Vasiliev (general, chemical engineer) is the director of the Criminalistics Institute.
 Stanislav Valentinovich Makshakov (colonel, Candidate of Medical Sciences) — deputy director of the Criminalistics Institute for Science.
 Vladimir Mikhailovich Bogdanov (major general) was the head of the Institute until Kirill Vasiliev (now he heads the higher organization Centre for special technology of the FSB and holds the position of deputy director of the scientific and technical service of the FSB).
 Anatoly Vladimirovich Fesenko (doctor of technical sciences) — former head of the Institute (1996—2006).

See also 

 Poison laboratory of the Soviet secret services

Notes

References 

Organizations established in 1977
Soviet intelligence agencies
Federal Security Service
KGB
Novichok_agents
Russian entities subject to the U.S. Department of the Treasury sanctions
Specially Designated Nationals and Blocked Persons List
Research institutes established in 1977
Research institutes in the Soviet Union